Timeline of mass transit in Atlanta:

1871 Richard Peters and George Adair run the first streetcars on the Atlanta Street Railway Company
1872 West End & Atlanta Street Railroad Company formed
1878 Adair sells out to Peters
1879 Gate City Street Railroad Company formed
1882 Metropolitan Street Railroad Company formed
1883 Fulton County Street Railroad Company formed 
1886 Joel Hurt forms the Atlanta & Edgewood Street Railroad Co.
1889 Hurt's streetcar begins to run between Five Points and Inman Park and control of Peter's company passed to son Edward C. Peters; Fulton County Street RR Co. begins powered by the electric Thomson-Houston system.
1890 Atlanta, West End & McPherson Barracks Ry. Co. begins powered by the electric Sprague system
1891 (May) Atlanta Consolidated Street Railway Company formed instigating the "Second Battle of Atlanta"
1892 Atlanta City Street Railway Co. begins powered by the electric Detroit system 
1902 All street railways consolidated as Georgia Railway and Power Company
1916 Atlanta transit strike of 1916 began at 6pm on Saturday, September 30 and ended that Monday evening, but the strike started after sundown those three days so the city wasn't completely paralyzed
1924 The Beeler Report issued to advise the financially ailing company
1926 Peak of passenger service (96,794,273)
1937 Trolleybuses introduced
1949 Georgia Power runs its last streetcar, leaving only trackless trolleys and buses
1950 Five week Atlanta transit strike of 1950
1950 Control of all transit passed to Atlanta Transit Company (ATC)
1959 System officially desegregated
1963 Trackless trolleys phased out leaving only buses
1965 MARTA formed (March) and Cobb County votes against joining
1971 Clayton and Gwinnett counties vote against joining MARTA with 4-1 margins
1972 MARTA purchases ATC for $13 million thus assuming control for all public transit
1975 Construction begins on MARTA rail system
1979 Operation begins on MARTA rail system
1999 Most recent MARTA station opens at North Springs, with no funding available for expansion since then
2006 (July) all 38 MARTA stations converted to Breeze Card digital fare system
December 2014 The new Atlanta Streetcar begin service from downtown to the Sweet Auburn district, and Clayton county joins MARTA

Notes

See also
 Streetcars in Atlanta
 Trolleybuses in Atlanta

History of Atlanta
Transportation in Atlanta
Mass transit in Atlanta